Nacuche is a village in Espita Municipality, Yucatan (Mexico) located on the Litoral Oriente (East Coast) or Region I of Yucatan. It has an average height of 29 meters. The population was 1,130 at the 2005 census made by the INEGI.

Geography 
Nacuche is located at  (20.922778, -88.295833). According to the census data by the INEGI, the village has an average elevation of 29 meters above sea level.

Climate 
The village has a climate of Aw1 (Köppen), warm humid, mean annual temperature over 22 °C and coldest month temperature over 18 °C. Precipitation of driest month less than 60 mm rainfall in summer and winter rainfall rate of 10.2% of the annual total.

Demographics 

As of the census of 2005 made by the INEGI, there were 1,130 people (7.83% of the municipality), of which 589 were men and 541 women. In the village were 240 households.

Education

See also 
 Espita Municipality
 Yucatan

References

External links
 Espita.gob.mx - Official site of the municipality (site temporarily suspended).
 Panoramio - Nacuche's photos at Panoramio.

Populated places in Yucatán